Soyuz 30 (Union 30) was a 1978 crewed Soviet space flight to the Salyut 6 space station. It was the sixth mission to and fifth successful docking at the orbiting facility. The Soyuz 30 crew were the first to visit the long-duration Soyuz 29 resident crew.

Soyuz 30 carried Pyotr Klimuk and Mirosław Hermaszewski, the first (and to date, only) Polish cosmonaut, aloft.

Crew

Backup crew

Mission parameters
Mass: 
Perigee: 
Apogee: 
Inclination: 51.66°
Period: 88.83 minutes

Mission highlights

The second Intercosmos mission was launched 27 June 1978 to the orbiting Salyut 6 space station. The Soyuz docked with the space station on 29 June, and cosmonauts Klimuk and Hermaszewski were greeted by Vladimir Kovalyonok and Aleksandr Ivanchenkov, the resident crew who had been on board for 12 days. For the third time, the Salyut was a four-man orbiting space laboratory.

The activities of the Soyuz 30 crew, however, were severely curtailed so as not to interfere with the Soyuz 29 crew. On the Soyuz 29 crew's rest day, the international crew had to stay in their Soyuz to perform their experiments. Nevertheless, Hermaszewski conducted many experiments. One was crystallization experiments which produced 47 grams of cadmium tellurium mercury semiconductors for use by infra-red detectors on board the station. The yield was far greater - 50% compared to 15% - than ground-based experiments.

The Soyuz 30 crew was trained, as all international crews, in the use of the MKF-6M camera. Training in part took place on a Tu-134 flying at 10 km to best mimic conditions on the station. Hermaszewski photographed Poland in co-ordination with aircraft taking close-up photos, but bad weather over Poland limited the photo sessions. They additionally filmed the Aurora Borealis.

Hermaszewski participated in medical experiments which measured lung capacity and the heart during exercise and in a pressure suit. One experiment, which all four on board the station participated in, was Smak (the Polish word for taste), a taste experiment which sought answers to why some food was less palatable in weightlessness.

The Soyuz 30 crew packed their experiments into their capsule and returned to Earth 5 July, landing in a Rostov state farm field 300 km west of Tselinograd.

See also

List of human spaceflights to Salyut space stations
List of Salyut expeditions

References

Crewed Soyuz missions
1978 in the Soviet Union
Poland–Soviet Union relations
1978 in Poland
Spacecraft launched in 1978
Spacecraft which reentered in 1978
Spacecraft launched by Soyuz-U rockets